Gulam Haidar bin Khan Bahadar is a Malaysian politician who has been the Assistant State Minister. He has served as the Member of Sabah State Legislative Assembly (MLA) for Kawang since March 2004. He was a member of the Parti Gagasan Rakyat Sabah (GAGASAN) which is a component part of the ruling Gabungan Rakyat Sabah (GRS) coalition both in federal and state levels.

Election results

Honours 
  :
  Commander of the Order of Kinabalu (PGDK) - Datuk (2015)
  :
  Companion Class I of the Order of Malacca (DMSM) - Datuk (2005)

References

Malaysian politicians
Living people
Year of birth missing (living people)